Aulonemia gueko is a species of bamboo in the genus Aulonemia. 
It is part of the grass family and endemic to Latin America.

References

gueko